The following is a list of episodes for Indio, a Filipino historical drama-epic fantasy television series, created and developed by Suzette Doctolero and produced by GMA Network. It premiered on January 14, 2013 on GMA Telebabad block. It concluded its twenty weeks run on May 31, 2013 with the total of ninety-seven episodes. The series features Ramon "Bong" Revilla, Jr. playing the title role, with Jennylyn Mercado, Michael de Mesa, Maxene Magalona and Rhian Ramos. It executive produced by Meann P. Regala and directed by Dondon Santos.

The series chronicles the life of Malaya/Simeon/Indio who rises from a lowly slave to a demigod on his quest for freedom from the Spanish Crown. With its high production value and powerhouse cast, the series is regards as a "telemovie" or a movie made for television and dubbed as the most expensive series of the network for 2013. The series is considered as a "ratings success" from its premiere telecast and have also received positive reviews both from viewers and critics.

Plot
In order to save her newborn son from certain doom, Ynaguiginid—the goddess of war—is forced to sacrifice her own immortality. Safe and alone in the forest under the watchful eyes of Magayon, the deity of flying creatures, Ynaguiginid's child is rescued by a native couple who name him Malaya. As Malaya grows up he manifests god-like powers which were inherited from his mother. His powers are witnessed by the villagers and Malaya is eventually looked upon as their savior.

However, as Spanish conquerors descend upon the land, Malaya is captured and enslaved. Years gone by and Malaya—now called Simeon—will have witnessed how terribly the Spaniards mistreat his countrymen. No longer able to bear the suffering and pain of his people, he is roused by Magayon of his true purpose. Simeon must fulfil his destiny to fight off the Spanish invaders and liberate his country.

Main cast

 Sen. Ramon "Bong" Revilla, Jr. as Malaya/Simeon/Indio
 Jennylyn Mercado as Esperanza Sanreal
 Rhian Ramos as Dian Magayon
 Michael de Mesa as Señor Juancho Sanreal

Series overview

List of episodes

Book 1

Book 2

External links
Official Indio website
Official GMA Network website

References

Lists of Philippine drama television series episodes
Lists of fantasy television series episodes